Mirbag-e Shomali Rural District is a rural district (dehestan) in the Central District of Delfan County, Lorestan Province, Iran. At the 2006 census, its population was 13,085, in 2,766 families.  The rural district has 39 villages.

References 

Rural Districts of Lorestan Province
Delfan County